ZARA is a Spanish multi-national retail clothing chain. It specialises in fast fashion, and sells clothing, accessories, shoes, beauty products and perfumes. The head office is in Arteixo, in A Coruña in Galicia. It is the largest constituent company of the Inditex group. In 2020 it was launching over twenty new product lines per year.

History

Early history
Zara was started by Amancio Ortega in 1975. His first shop was in central A Coruña, in Galicia, Spain – where the company is still based. He initially called it Zorba after the classic 1964 film Zorba the Greek, but after learning there was a bar with the same name two blocks away, he rearranged the letters to read "Zara". It is believed the extra a came from an additional set of letters that had been made for the company. It sold low-priced lookalike products of popular, higher-end clothing fashions. He opened more shops in Spain. During the 1980s, he changed the design, manufacturing, and distribution process to reduce lead times and react more quickly to new trends – what he called "instant fashions" – using information technology and groups of designers rather than individuals.

Expansion
The first shop outside Spain was opened in 1985 in Porto, in Portugal. In 1989, the company entered the United States, and then France in 1990. During the 1990s, Zara expanded to Mexico (1992), Greece, Belgium, Sweden (1993) and Israel (1997). In the early 2000s, Zara opened its first stores in Brazil (2000); Japan and Singapore (2002); Ireland, Venezuela, Russia and Malaysia (2003); China, Morocco, Estonia, Hungary and Romania (2004); the Philippines, Costa Rica and Indonesia (2005); South Korea (2008); India (2010); Taiwan, South Africa and Australia (2011); and Peru (2012).

In September 2010, Zara launched its online boutique. The website began in Jordan. In November of that same year, Zara Online extended its service to five more countries: Austria, Ireland, the Netherlands, Belgium and Luxembourg. Online stores began operating in the United States in 2011, Russia and Canada in 2013, Mexico in 2014, South Korea in 2014, Romania in 2016,  India in 2017, Israel and Brazil in 2019, and Peru in 2020.

Zara introduced the use of RFID technology in its stores in 2014. The RFID chips are located in the security tags which are removed from clothing when purchased and can be reused. The chip allows the company to quickly take inventory by detecting radio signals from the RFID tags. When an item is sold, the stockroom is immediately notified so that the item can be replaced. An item that is not on the shelf can easily be found with the RFID tag.

In 2015, Zara was ranked #30 on Interbrand's list of best global brands.

In 2019, Zara updated their logo. It was designed by the French agency Baron & Baron.

In 2019, the global fashion business Journal MDS stated that while the textile commerce of the world had gone down by 2.38%, Zara's had risen 2.17%.

In 2019, Chief Executive Persson said the brand is waiting for more acceptable global rent levels to continue its expansion. In Europe, the brand planned to cut the number of retail locations beginning in 2020. As of January 2023, the clothing retailer has nearly 3000 stores, including its kids and home stores. Spanning over 96 countries and continuing to grow.

Products
Zara stores have men's and women's clothing as well as children's clothing (Zara Kids). Zara Home designs are located in European stores. The majority of Zara customers are aged between 18 and about 35. After products are designed, they take 10 to 15 days to reach the stores. All of the clothing is processed through the distribution center in Spain. New items are inspected, sorted, tagged, and loaded into trucks. In most cases, the clothing is delivered within 48 hours. Zara produces over 450 million items per year.

Zara also includes accessories, shoes, swimwear, beauty and perfumes.

In May 2021, Zara launched its first beauty line, ZARA Beauty.

Under its Zara Home line, Zara launched what is believed to be the first detergent that reduces the abrasion of textile microfibres during washing. It is claimed the solution, jointly developed by Inditex and BASF Home Care and I&I Solutions Europe in Spain and Germany, can reduce the release of microfibres by up to 80 per cent, depending on fabric type and washing conditions.

Manufacturing and distribution
Reportedly, Zara needs just one week to develop a new product and get it to stores, compared to the six-month industry average, and makes roughly 40,000 designs of which around 12,000 new designs are carefully selected and produced each year. Zara has a policy of zero advertising; the company preferred to invest a percentage of revenues in opening new stores instead.

Zara set up its own factory in La Coruña (a city known for its textile industry) in 1980 and upgraded to reverse milk-run-type production and distribution facilities in 1990. This approach, designed by Toyota Motor Corp., was called the just-in-time (JIT) system. It enabled the company to establish a business model that allows self-containment throughout the stages of materials, manufacture, product completion, and distribution to stores worldwide within just a few days.

Most of the products Zara sells are manufactured in Spain, Portugal, Turkey, Morocco, Bangladesh  and more recently - Armenia. While some competitors outsource all production to Asia, Zara manufactures its most fashionable items – half of all its merchandise – at a dozen company-owned factories in Spain (particularly in Galicia), Portugal (northern part) and Turkey. Clothes with a longer shelf life, such as basic T-shirts, are outsourced to low-cost suppliers, mainly in Asia.

The company can design a new product and have finished goods in its stores in four to five weeks; it can modify existing items in as little as two weeks. Shortening the product life cycle means greater success in meeting consumer preferences. If a design does not sell well within a week, it is withdrawn from shops, further orders are canceled and a new design is pursued. Zara monitors customers' fashion changes.  Zara has a range of basic designs that are carried over from year to year, but some fashion-forward designs can stay on the shelves less than four weeks, which encourages Zara fans to make repeat visits.  An average high-street store in Spain expects customers to visit three times a year. That goes up to 17 times for Zara.

As a result of increasing competitive pressures from the online shopping market, Zara is shifting its focus onto online as well, and will consequently open fewer but larger stores in the future. In May 2022, a £1.95 return fee was implemented for some online orders in Britain and other core markets. This fee was introduced in Spain as of February 2023.

In November 2022, a pre-owned platform will also be launched via its website and app in UK. Other than posting now-unwanted Zara purchases online for sale, shoppers can book repairs and donate unwanted items online or via a store. If successful, this service will be expanded to other key markets.

Starting November 2022, Russians will be able to order products online from a range U.S. and European brands, including Nike, Zara and H&M, according to an announcement from Russia's postal service.

Non-toxic clothing
In 2011, Greenpeace  started a dialog with Zara to ban toxics from the clothing production. Greenpeace published its "Toxic threads: the big fashion stitch-up" report in November 2012 as part of its Detox Campaign identifying companies that use toxic substances in their manufacturing processes. Nine days after the report was published, Zara committed to eradicating all releases of hazardous chemicals throughout its entire supply chain and products by 2020. Zara became the biggest retailer in the world to raise awareness for the Detox Campaign, and switched to a fully toxic-free production.

Controversies

Exploitation and child labour

In 2016, BBC News stated they found evidence of child labor and exploitation in factories in Turkey. Zara replied that there were some issues in June 2016 in one single factory and, instead of solving these issues immediately, they have given a period of six months to solve them.

Allegations of Anti-Semitism 
In 2007, Zara withdrew a handbag from its shelves after a customer noticed a swastika on the bag's design. The bag came from an external supplier, and Zara claimed the symbol was not visible when the handbag was chosen. Zara withdrew the product from stores, and spokesperson Susan Suett said the bag would not have been sourced had the symbol been apparent.

In August 2014, Zara received criticism for selling a toddler T-shirt for closely resembling uniforms worn by Jewish concentration camp inmates. The T-shirt was striped and featured a yellow star similar to the Star of David. Zara said the design was inspired by "the sheriff's stars from the classic western films". Zara removed the shirt from sale a few hours after they appeared for sale, and apologized. Zara received criticism for selling the T-shirt in Israel because the country does not have sheriffs. Additionally, the word "Sheriff" is outlined in transparent letters on the bright yellow star. The Anti-Defamation League responded to the shirt, saying that it was offensive, but welcomed Zara's recognition of the potential imagery and removing the shirt from sale.

Labour practices 
In August 2011, a Brazilian television show accused the company of using sweatshops for their outsourced production. The Regional Superintendency of Labour and Employment of São Paulo, Brazil, closed a factory that produced Zara's clothing for its poor labour conditions. Zara's representatives said the accusations of slave labour made against the retailer represent a breach of the code of conduct for workshops of Inditex. The company also states factories responsible for unauthorized outsourcing have been asked to regularize immediately the situation of the workers involved.

In September 2013, Bangladeshi garment workers for suppliers to Zara and its parent company, Inditex, protested following the 2013 Dhaka garment factory collapse, demanding a US$100 a month minimum wage. Inditex does not publicly disclose the factories that produce their branded clothing.

In November 2017, customers shopping at Zara stores in Istanbul, Turkey, found handwritten notes purportedly from Turkish workers in the pockets of in-store garments asking shoppers to pressure Zara into paying them unpaid wages. The company clarified the unpaid wages were due to a third-party manufacturer Bravo Tekstil, who had failed to pay their employees. The company said they would help to provide compensation to employees who weren't paid. In the agreement, only factory-floor employees were compensated, with "white-collar" employees not covered by the agreement.

In 2022, about 1,000 shop assistants who work at Zara and other fashion brands owned by Inditex went on strike on Black Friday in the company's home town in northern Spain to demand better salaries. Prior to a second strike, Inditex, Zara's parent company, has agreed to pay 322 euros more per month to shop assistants from 44 stores. Workers will also get a one-off bonus of 1,000 euros to be paid in February 2023.

Copyright infringement 
In July 2016, complaints were made against Zara that they had been stealing designs from multiple independent designers for their products. One of the designers, Tuesday Bassen, who previously worked with brands including Urban Outfitters and Nike, contacted Zara. The company responded Bassen's designs were not distinctive enough, and they received only a handful of complaints given the large volume of traffic they receive on their site. When the news was eventually picked up by media outlets, and Inditex, Zara's owning company, was asked to comment on the issue, Inditex replied that the items in question have been suspended from sale, and that they are in contact with Bassen's lawyer to clarify and address the issue.

As of April 2018, MaXhosa by Laduma is taking legal action against Zara for copying its designs. Zara responded to complaints from the designer by removing socks that resembled his artistic style.

Melania Trump 
In June 2018, a Zara jacket with "I really don't care, do U?" emblazoned on the back became controversial after it was worn by Melania Trump when she visited a detention center for migrant children separated from their parents.

Political controversy in China 
In January 2018, Shanghai's internet authority summoned representatives of Zara, chastising the company for listing Taiwan as a "country" and ordering it to rectify the situation immediately.

In September 2019, Zara supported Hong Kong strikes; however after pressures from Chinese social media Zara was forced to issue a statement expressing its support of the "one country, two systems" policy adopted by China in ruling Hong Kong, and its disapproval of anti-government strikes.

Xinjiang region 
In 2020, the Australian Strategic Policy Institute accused at least 82 major brands, including Zara, of being connected to forced Uyghur labor in Xinjiang.

Allegations of anti-Palestinian bullying 
In June 2021, the company's women's head fashion designer Vanessa Perilman made comments blaming terrorism in Gaza on Palestinians in response to Palestinian model Qaher Harhash. After receiving backlash for her comments when they were made public by Qaher, Perilman apologized and Zara later asked Qaher to post Perilman's apology on his social media. Because of Zara's delayed response, and decision to not fire Perilman, calls to boycott Zara emerged through social media.

Trademark Action 

In April 2022 it was reported that Zara had taken legal action against "Tara Sartoria", a small clothing company owned by Vietnamese citizen Tara Nguyen.  Ms Nguyen's company sells products made by disadvantaged women in Indonesia and Vietnam.

Stores

There are 2003 Zara stores in 96 countries.

In early 2020 due to the COVID-19 pandemic, ZARA stores worldwide had closed temporarily due to restrictions. However, in April 2020, ZARA's owner ramped up shipment to Asia as China ended its lockdown after 76 days.

Fashion Music

In 2021, Kandra has already provided over 2.7 million views to Zara's fashion playlists on its YouTube channel, representing over 20% of their current zara-style audience. Currently Kandra's channel provides playlists for luxury stores and department stores around the world, such as H&M, Bershka, Chanel, Balenciaga and more.

See also

 Bershka
 H&M

References

External links

 

Clothing brands of Spain
Clothing companies established in 1975
Clothing retailers of Spain
Companies based in Galicia (Spain)
Retail companies established in 1975
Inditex brands
Spanish companies established in 1975